The OFC Futsal Champions League is a futsal competition for Oceanian club teams organized by the Oceania Football Confederation (OFC). The first edition was held in December 2019 in New Zealand, with the champion futsal clubs from six nations represented.

Originally to be held annually, both 2020 and 2021 editions were cancelled due to the COVID-19 pandemic. The next edition in 2022 was brought forward from December to October.

Summaries

See also
OFC Futsal Championship

References

Oceania Football Confederation club competitions
Futsal in Oceania
International club futsal competitions
Multi-national professional sports leagues